Extended school time is a proposal in the United States for increasing the number of mandatory hours per week that students spend at school.

The 1983 report by the U.S. National Commission on Excellence in Education, A Nation at Risk, suggested that expectations, content, and time needed to be improved in American education. Since then increasing the amount of time in school became a hot topic, and for the past few years, the proposal saw a resurgence of interest in response to No Child Left Behind, with dozens of proposals around the nation to extend the school year. In December 2009, President Obama proposed that American school children extend their time in class, either by lengthening the school day or the school year. 

A July 2010 Time magazine article has a chart showing that students in the United States have the highest total yearly instructional hours of those nations listed. 

Various studies have yielded widely different results in regard to the correlation between school time and academic achievement. Massachusetts 2020 and its national affiliate, the National Center on Time & Learning, are resources for an enlarging group of states and districts that are exploring expanded learning time—several of which, including Oklahoma, Alabama, and Rhode Island, have launched new initiatives in 2010. In 2006, Massachusetts 2020 worked with state leaders in Massachusetts to spearhead the Massachusetts Expanded Learning Time Initiative, the first-in-the-nation statewide initiative to expand the school day. In 2010–2011, 19 schools in 10 school districts will have schedules increase learning time by 300 hours across the school year.

Research suggests that expanding instructional time is as effective as other commonly discussed educational interventions intended to boost learning, such as increasing teacher quality and reducing class size.  It also suggests that the added high-quality teaching time particularly benefits certain groups of students, such as low-income students and others who have little opportunity for learning outside of school. Researchers caution that not all time in school is equal. The correlation between time and achievement increases exists only when students are given more instructional time and academic learning time. Other researchers conclude that more time spent in the classroom will have little impact on academic achievement if it is not accompanied by other education reforms. They show that the key to student learning gains is the quality of the teacher, not the amount of time spent in school. Some homeschooler families are objective of the proposal on the basis that longer school time takes more away from family time. Cost is another major factor; though like per pupil costs, hard to generalize across states, due to differences in geography, cost-of-living costs, right-to-work vs. union states, etc. In 1990, cost estimates ranged from $2.3 to $121.4 million per day, depending on the state. In addition, advocates for a return to a later, more traditional start to the school day caution that extending school time by beginning the day even earlier in the morning can be counterproductive and even unhealthy, interfering with the sleep needs of middle and high school students in the many schools where the first bell already rings in the 7 a.m. hour and bus runs start at 5:30 or 6 a.m.—a practice that has become increasingly common since the 1970s.

References

Education in the United States
Education reform
Education policy in the United States